Ancy-sur-Moselle is a former commune in the Moselle department in northeastern France. On 1 January 2016, it was merged into the new commune Ancy-Dornot.

Population

See also 
 Communes of the Moselle department
 Parc naturel régional de Lorraine

References 

Former communes of Moselle (department)
Populated places disestablished in 2016